An optimist is a person with a positive outlook on life.

Optimist, (The) Optimist(s), or similar may also refer to:

Albums and songs
 The Optimist LP and The Optimist Live, albums by Turin Brakes
 The Optimist (Anathema album), 2017, or the title song
 The Optimist (DD Smash album), 1984, or the title song
 The Optimist (New Young Pony Club album), 2010, or the title song
 Optimist (album), a 2021 album by Finneas O'Connell
 "The Optimist", a song from The Dreams on their 2010 album Revolt
 "The Optimist", a song by Emma Pollock from her 2007 album Watch the Fireworks

Film and television
 The Optimist (TV series), a 1983 British television comedy series 
 The Optimists (film), a 2006 Serbian film directed by Goran Paskaljević
 The Optimists of Nine Elms, a 1974 British film also known as The Optimists
 The Optimists (original title: Оптимисты), a 2017 Russian historical drama series directed by Alexei Popogrebski

Other uses
 Optimist (dinghy), a class of small sailing dinghy intended for use by children
 The Optimists (novel), a 2005 novel by Andrew Miller
 A member of Optimist International
 The Optimist, the student newspaper of Abilene Christian University

See also

 Optimistic (disambiguation)
 Optimism (disambiguation)
 Optimization (disambiguation)
 Optimum (disambiguation)